Geoica utricularia is a species of aphid. It is a pest of millets.

References

Aphididae